The 2019–20 Erkekler Basketbol Süper Ligi season, is the premier men's basketball competition in Northern Cyprus.

Competition format
Six teams joined the regular season and competed in a double-legged round-robin tournament. The four best qualified teams of the regular season joined the playoffs.

Teams

Regular season

League table

Results

References

External links
TRNC Basketball Federation

Northern Cyprus
Basketball in Northern Cyprus